Gregory Cousins (born 1964), of Tampa, Florida, was third mate at the time of Exxon Valdez oil spill. He was left in control of the vessel, but failed to maneuver it to the required lane, when it struck Bligh Reef in Prince William Sound. Cousins had a Coast Guard license to command the ship in most waters, but did not have the special endorsement that was required for Prince William Sound.

References

People from Tampa, Florida
Exxon Valdez oil spill
1964 births
Living people
ExxonMobil people